Melodrama is the first studio album by Joel Kroeker and the second of his albums after his 1999 independent release CD Naive Bohemian. The album was released in 2004 on True North Records and was produced by Danny Greenspoon. It was registered at the "Canterbury Sound" in Toronto, Ontario, in Canada.

Track listing
 "Endings" (3:43)
 "The Wind" (3:43)
 "Goodbye Jane" (3:18)
 "Soft" (4:16)
 "Paradise" (3:25)
 "Song For a Person on a Bridge" (4:38)
 "The Smallest Room" (3:52)
 "Your Painted Face" (3:02)
 "Simple" (4:48)
 "Naked Beauty" (3:11)
 "With Me" (3:20)
 "Blue Moon Lounge" (3:48)

Single from the album
 "Goodbye Jane"

Personnel
Joel Kroeker - vocals
Kevin Breit - guitar
Gary Breit - keyboards
Gary Craig - drums
George Koller - bass guitar
Kathryn Rose - backing vocals
Suzie Vinnick - backing vocals
Randy Bachman - guitar on "With Me"

External links
 Melodrama on Myspace

2004 albums
Joel Kroeker albums
True North Records albums